Jacopo Giachetti (born December 7, 1983) is an Italian basketball player for Basket Ravenna Piero Manetti. A  point guard, he was born in Pisa, Italy.

Professional career
Giachetti spent most of his career with Lottomatica Roma. On June 27, 2008, he signed a multi-year contract extension with the team. In July 2011, he signed a two-year contract with Olimpia Milano. In the summer of 2013, he signed with Reyer Venezia Mestre.

In August 2014, he signed with PMS Torino.
In August 2017, Serie A2 Team Basket Ravenna Piero Manetti announced that for the season 2017-2018 Giacchetti will join the team.

References

External links

 Euroleague.net Profile
 eurobasket.com Profile

1983 births
Living people
Competitors at the 2005 Mediterranean Games
Italian men's basketball players
Mediterranean Games gold medalists for Italy
Point guards
Reyer Venezia players
Mediterranean Games medalists in basketball